Pochodeň ('The Torch') was a Czech language left-wing weekly newspaper published from Chicago, United States, between June 1896 and May 1899.

References

Czech-American history
Czech-language newspapers published in the United States
Czech-American culture in Chicago
Defunct newspapers published in Chicago
Publications established in 1896
Publications disestablished in 1899
1896 establishments in Illinois
Non-English-language newspapers published in Illinois
1899 disestablishments in Illinois
Defunct weekly newspapers